The Battle of Aclea occurred in 851 between the West Saxons led by Æthelwulf, King of Wessex and the Danish Vikings at an unknown location in Surrey but possibly Ockley. It resulted in a West Saxon victory.

Little is known about the battle and the most important source of information comes from the Anglo-Saxon Chronicle which recorded that:
three and a half hundred ships came into the mouth of the Thames and stormed Canterbury and London and put to flight Beorhtwulf, King of Mercia with his army, and then went south over the Thames into Surrey and King Æthelwulf and his son Æthelbald with the West Saxon army fought against them at Aclea, and there made the greatest slaughter of a heathen raiding-army that we have heard tell of up to the present day, and there took the victory."

Aclea means Oak Field, as Asser explained. This could survive as Oakley or Ockley. Ockley is a village in Surrey that could be a logical location for the battle. If the Vikings followed Stane Street (Chichester) south from London Bridge, the only crossing over the Thames into Surrey, they would have come to the gap in the North Downs and passed through Dorking. If the West Saxons were coming north along Stane Street then they could have met at Ockley.

References 

Aclea
Aclea
Aclea
Aclea
851
9th century in England